The Basilica of La Merced, also known as Convent of La Merced, is a minor basilica located in the city of Cusco, Peru. It is located 100 meters southwest of the Plaza de Armas (city's main square) in front of the Plazoleta Espinar. It belongs to the Order of the Blessed Virgin Mary of Mercy and has, annexes, both the convent and the premises of La Merced College. The church has a three-nave basilica plan covered with brick vaults and dome on the crossing, with Baroque altars on its lateral naves and Neoclassical style on the main altar. It also has a tower with Baroque bell tower topped with a semicircular dome. Highlights its portal-side reredos and the Renaissance portal of the muro de pies, the choir stalls, its colonial paintings and polychrome wood carvings. Inside rest the remains of Diego de Almagro, Diego de Almagro II and Gonzalo Pizarro.

Since 1972 the property is part of the monumental area of Cusco declared as a Historic Monument of Peru. Also being part of the historic center of the city of Cusco, it is part of the area declared a World Heritage Site by UNESCO in 1983.

History

The Basilica of La Merced was founded by Friar Sebastián de Trujillo Castañeda between 1535 and 1536. By 1538, Francisco Pizarro donated to the Mercedarians the estate called Limpipata adjacent to the Kusipata square where the construction of the first Mercedarian church in the city began. The current church replaced the first church destroyed by the earthquake of 1650. The current church had to be built between 1651 and 1670 while the tower had to be built between 1692 and 1696 as well as the second cloister of the convent.

Description

Inside there is a spectacular series of murals depicting the life of the Merced Order's founder, Peter Nolasco.

Mercedarian monstrance
The monstrance is exhibited inside one of the main cloister environments of the Basilica of La Merced. It is a work of goldsmith made with gold and precious stones, with a total weight of 22 kilos of weight and 130 centimeters in height. It has 230 grams of gold and silver, 1538 diamonds, 628 pearls, 312 amethysts, 3 emeralds, 1 topaz and dozens of rubies and other gems; the monstrance has carved among them some angels in the upper part, the virgin in the center, bottom the mermaid and a sheep near the base of the monstrance.

Sculpture of St. Peter Nolasco
The sculpture of St. Peter Nolasco that the church has is attributed to the Cusco-born Inca sculptor, Melchor Guamán Maita.

Museum
A small museum of religious art is found in the sacristy.

Christ of the Earthquakes

In the customary departure of Holy Monday, the Christ of the Earthquakes, patron of the city of Cusco, arrives at the Basilica of La Merced to stay for an hour, to perform mass and receiving it with Christian songs. The Christ of the Earthquakes gets to change his habit from the Monastery of San José y Santa Teresa.

See also
List of buildings and structures in Cusco

References

External links
The Basilica of La Merced website 360° views and information

Roman Catholic churches in Cusco
1536 establishments in the Viceroyalty of Peru
Roman Catholic churches completed in 1696
Basilica churches in Peru
Baroque church buildings in Peru
Renaissance architecture in Peru
Burials in Peru
Museums in Cusco
17th-century Roman Catholic church buildings in Peru
Cultural heritage of Peru